Lorna Forde (born 24 June 1952) is a Barbadian sprinter. She competed in the women's 100 metres and women's 400 metres at the 1976 Summer Olympics. Forde competed in the 4 × 400 metres relay at the 1972 Summer Olympics. Forde won bronze in the 400 metres and finished seventh in the 200 metres at the 1975 Pan American Games.

References

1952 births
Living people
Athletes (track and field) at the 1972 Summer Olympics
Athletes (track and field) at the 1976 Summer Olympics
Barbadian female sprinters
Olympic athletes of Barbados
Pan American Games bronze medalists for Barbados
Pan American Games medalists in athletics (track and field)
Athletes (track and field) at the 1975 Pan American Games
Commonwealth Games competitors for Barbados
Athletes (track and field) at the 1974 British Commonwealth Games
Place of birth missing (living people)
Medalists at the 1975 Pan American Games
Olympic female sprinters